A Dove Award is an accolade by the Gospel Music Association (GMA) of the United States to recognize outstanding achievement in the Christian music industry. The awards are presented annually. Formerly held in Nashville, Tennessee, the Dove Awards took place in Atlanta, Georgia during 2011 and 2012, but has since moved back to Nashville. The ceremonies feature live musical performances and are broadcast on TBN.

The awards were established in 1969, and represent a variety of musical styles, including rock, pop, hip hop, country, and urban.

History

The Dove Awards were originally conceptualized by Gospel singer and songwriter Bill Gaither, at a Gospel Music Association board meeting in 1968. The idea of the award being represented by a dove is credited to Gaither and design for the award itself is credited to gospel singer Les Beasley and designer Bob McConnell. The first GMA Dove Awards were held at the Peabody Hotel in Memphis, Tennessee in October 1969. In 1971, the awards moved to Nashville.

The 3rd GMA Dove Awards of 1971 were deemed invalid due to apparent ballot stuffing by the southern gospel group the Blackwood Brothers, and that year is still not considered an official awards year by the Gospel Music Association. There were no awards held in 1979, due to a decision by the Gospel Music Association to move the awards from autumn to spring. Every ceremony since has been held in the spring. The first televised ceremony was the 15th GMA Dove Awards of 1984, which aired on the Christian Broadcasting Network.

The awards were held in Nashville until 2011 before being presented at the Fox Theatre in Atlanta, Georgia in 2012. They returned to Nashville in 2013, and have been held at the Allen Arena on the campus of Lipscomb University since.

Categories

Because of the large number of award categories (42 in 2012), and the desire to feature several performances by various artists, only the ones with the most popular interest are presented directly at the televised version of the award ceremony.

General
The "General Field" includes seven awards which are not restricted by genre:

 Song of the Year is awarded to the songwriter and the publisher.
 Dove Award for Songwriter of the Year
 Male Vocalist of the Year
 Female Vocalist of the Year
 Group of the Year
 Artist of the Year
 New Artist of the Year
 Producer of the Year

Other awards are given for performances in specific genres, as well as for other contributions such as artwork and video. As of the 43rd Dove Awards, these include:

Inspirational
 Inspirational Recorded Song of the Year
 Inspirational Album of the Year

Pop
 Pop/Contemporary Recorded Song of the Year
 Pop/Contemporary Album of the Year

Southern Gospel
 Southern Gospel Recorded Song of the Year
 Southern Gospel Album of the Year

Gospel (soul/black)
 Traditional Gospel Recorded Song of the Year
 Traditional Gospel Album of the Year
 Contemporary Gospel Recorded Song of the Year
 Contemporary Gospel Album of the Year

Musicals
 Musical of the Year
 Youth/Children's Musical of the Year

Praise & Worship
 Worship Song of the Year
 Worship-Recorded Song of the Year
 Worship Album of the Year

Country & Bluegrass
 Country Recorded Song of the Year
 Country Album of the Year
 Bluegrass Recorded Song of the Year
 Bluegrass Album of the Year

Rock
 Rock Recorded Song of the Year
 Rock/Contemporary Recorded Song of the Year
 Rock Album of the Year
 Rock/Contemporary Album of the Year

Rap/Hip Hop & Urban
 Rap/Hip Hop Recorded Song of the Year
 Rap/Hip Hop Album of the Year
 Urban Recorded Song of the Year

Miscellaneous
 Instrumental Album of the Year
 Children's Music Album of the Year
 Spanish Language Album of the Year
 Special Event Album of the Year
 Christmas Album of the Year
 Choral Collection of the Year
 Recorded Music Packaging
 Short Form Music Video of the Year
 Long Form Music Video of the Year
 Inspirational Film of the Year

Re-definition of gospel music
In 1998 the GMA published a new definition of gospel music. According to the definition, to be considered eligible for the Dove Awards, music was required to have lyrics that were:

 Substantially based upon historically orthodox Christian truth contained in or derived from the Holy Bible
 An expression of worship of God or praise for His works; and /or
 Testimony of relationship with God through Christ; and/or
 Obviously prompted and informed by a Christian world view.

Prior to the definition, the only qualified music was that sold in Christian Booksellers Association affiliated stores. The new standards resulted in complaints by some fans and artists after thirteen entries were disqualified as being too secular in the 1999 Dove Awards. The rules were rescinded afterwards, and many groups disqualified by the rulings in 1999 were winners in 2000.

The GMA's current policy states: "From time to time, screening judges may encounter product submissions that raise questions about whether or not the product’s content is appropriate for the GMA Dove Awards. To assist the judges in their determination, the GMA Board has authorized the following content criteria for use in these instances: 'For purposes of GMA Dove Award eligibility, the content of all entries will be: based upon the historically orthodox Christian faith contained in or derived from the Holy Bible; or apparently prompted and informed by a Christian world-view.'"

See also

 Christian pop culture
 Gospel Music Association of Canada Covenant Awards
 List of religion-related awards

References

External links
 
 GMA website

 
Culture of Nashville, Tennessee
Awards established in 1969
American music awards
1969 establishments in Tennessee